Romania competed at the 2017 World Games held in Wrocław, Poland.

Medalists

Aerobic gymnastics 

Gabriel Bocser, Andreea Bogati, Lucian Săvulescu, Dacian Barna and Marian Brotei won the silver medal in the open event group event.

Andreea Bogati and Dacian Barna won the bronze medal in the mixed pairs events.

Dancesport 

Paul Ionut Rednic and Roxana Lucaciu competed in the Standard competition.

References 

Nations at the 2017 World Games
2017 in Romanian sport
2017